Nicolás Ignacio Diez Parajón (born 9 February 1977 in Buenos Aires) is an Argentine football coach and former player who played as a winger.

Club career
In July 2009, Diez signed for Deportivo Táchira of Primera División Venezolana for plays the Torneo Apertura 2009, in the same tournament Diez was proclaimed champions of the Apertura.

In 2011, he played for his last professional club: Chile's Ñublense.

International career
Diez appeared for the Argentina U-20 in Malaysia, with players such as Esteban Cambiasso, Juan Román Riquelme and Pablo Aimar. He also having a good friendly relationship with Juan Pablo Sorín.

Personal life
He naturalized Chilean by residence.

Titles

Club
Deportivo Táchira
 Primera División Venezolana (1): 2009 Apertura

International 
 FIFA U-20 World Cup (1): 1997

References

 
 Nicolás Diez – Argentine Primera statistics at Fútbol XXI  
 

1977 births
Living people
Footballers from Buenos Aires
Argentine footballers
Argentine expatriate footballers
Argentinos Juniors footballers
Racing Club de Avellaneda footballers
Ferro Carril Oeste footballers
Unión de Santa Fe footballers
FC Gueugnon players
Deportivo Pereira footballers
Everton de Viña del Mar footballers
O'Higgins F.C. footballers
Deportes La Serena footballers
Ñublense footballers
Deportivo Táchira F.C. players
A.C.C.D. Mineros de Guayana players
Expatriate footballers in France
Expatriate footballers in Colombia
Expatriate footballers in Chile
Expatriate footballers in Venezuela
Argentine expatriate sportspeople in France
Argentine expatriate sportspeople in Colombia
Argentine expatriate sportspeople in Chile
Argentine expatriate sportspeople in Venezuela
Argentine Primera División players
Primera Nacional players
Ligue 2 players
Categoría Primera A players
Chilean Primera División players
Venezuelan Primera División players
Argentina youth international footballers
Argentina under-20 international footballers
Association football midfielders
Naturalized citizens of Chile
Argentine football managers
Chilean football managers